Leucothoe keiskei, the Keskei dog hobble or Keskei fetterbush, is a species of flowering plant in the family Ericaceae, native to southern Honshu, Japan. A perennial evergreen shrub reaching , there are a number of cultivars, including 'Royal Ruby' and 'Opstal50', trade designation .

References

Vaccinioideae
Endemic flora of Japan
Plants described in 1863